Grande-Île is an island in the St. Lawrence River in Quebec, Canada.  The island is mostly occupied by the city Salaberry-de-Valleyfield. Part of the Hochelaga Archipelago, the island connects the Beauharnois-Salaberry and the Vaudreuil-Soulanges regions over the Saint Lawrence River via the Pont Monseigneur Langlois. Grande-Île was also the name of a municipality on the island which merged with Salaberry-de-Valleyfield on January 1, 2002.

References

Hochelaga Archipelago
Communities in Montérégie
Former municipalities in Quebec
Salaberry-de-Valleyfield
Landforms of Montérégie
River islands of Quebec
Islands of the Saint Lawrence River
Populated places disestablished in 2002